"Make It On My Own" is a song by British singer and former dancer Alison Limerick, released in February 1992 as the second single from her debut solo album, And Still I Rise (1992). It was a hit in the clubs and reached number 16 in the United Kingdom. On the Eurochart Hot 100, the song reached number 64, while in the United States, it peaked at number six on the Billboard Hot Dance Club Play chart. In 1996, the song was remixed by house music producers Dancing Divaz and this version peaked at number 30 in the UK.

Critical reception
Larry Flick from Billboard wrote, "After a healthy run on import, British lass is poised to duplicate the success of her now-classic hit "Where Love Lives". String-lined remixes give the R&B/house tune a light and airy vibe. And how 'bout those vocals! They evoke images of a young Dionne Warwick. Brilliant." Pan-European magazine Music & Media noted, "The recipe for good '70s soul used by the likes of Gloria Gaynor and Sister Sledge proves to work as well in our time, the main differences being more beats per minute and less bass." Andy Beevers from Music Week stated that Limerick "returns to what she does best. This is an extremely catchy soulful song with dancefloor friendly mixes courtesy of Steve Anderson and Tony Humphries." James Hamilton from the RM Dance Update deemed it "incredibly catchy attractive yet forceful".

Upon the release of the 1996 Dancing Divaz remix, a reviewer from Music Week rated it four out of five, commenting, "Despite her breathtaking voice, soul diva status has eluded Limerick, but the reworked anthem sounds fresh and should succeed." Also Daisy & Havoc from the RM Dance Update gave the new remix four out of five.

Music video
A music video was produced to promote the single, featuring Limerick performing with musicians in a dance restaurant after closing time. It was later published on YouTube in December 2012. The 1996 Dancing Divaz version was published in November 2012.

Track listings

Charts

Yōko Oginome version

"Make It On My Own" was covered by former pop idol, actress and voice actress Yōko Oginome as her 37th single and first maxi-single, released on 21 August 1997 by Victor Entertainment. Produced by Shinichi Osawa of Mondo Grosso, the single and album extended mix were recorded in Japanese while the English version was recorded as the "Original Mix" and other remixes.

Track listing
All songs are composed by Steve Anderson, Junior Giscombe, Alan Glass, Alison Limerick, and Robbie Taylor, except where indicated; all music is arranged by Shinichi Osawa.

References

External links
Alison Limerick
 
 

Yōko Oginome
 
 
 

1992 singles
1996 singles
1997 singles
1992 songs
Alison Limerick songs
Yōko Oginome songs
Dance-pop songs
Eurodance songs
House music songs
Japanese-language songs
Victor Entertainment singles

ja:Make It On My Own